Twisted Wires & the Acoustic Sessions... is the first acoustic studio album by American hard rock band Tesla. It was released on July 12, 2011. The album features two new tracks ("2nd Street" and "Better Off Without You") as well as re-recordings of ten previously released tracks. Five of the tracks were recorded in 2005 with Tommy Skeoch on rhythm guitar.

Track listing

 Recorded in 2005 with Tommy Skeoch.

Personnel
Band
 Jeff Keith - lead vocals
 Frank Hannon - electric & acoustic guitars, keyboards and backing vocals
 Brian Wheat - bass guitar and background vocals
 Troy Luccketta - drums and percussion
 Dave Rude - electric, acoustic & slide guitars and backing vocals

Production
 George Marino - mixing & Mastering
 Tesla - Producers

References
http://teslatheband.com/music/twistedwire

Tesla (band) albums
2011 albums